A Woman from the Street is a 1939 Argentine drama film directed by Luis Moglia Barth. The film was premiered on August 23, 1939, in Buenos Aires and starred Aida Alberti.

Cast
 Aida Alberti
 Pepita Serrador
 Roberto Airaldi
 Miguel Gómez Bao
 María Esther Buschiazzo
 José Otal
 Pablo Cumo
 Samuel Giménez
 Samuel Sanda

External links
 

1939 films
1930s Spanish-language films
Argentine black-and-white films
Films directed by Luis Moglia Barth
1939 drama films
Argentine drama films
1930s Argentine films